Splash! Vedete la Apă is a reality television show which teaches celebrities the art of diving. The first series is featured to start on 7 July 2013, and it will be broadcast by Antena 1. Pepe will be hosting the show, with Roxana Ionescu and Roxana Vancea. The judges were Anda Adam, Daniel Buzdugan, and Cătălin Preda. Now the series broadcast the third season on Antena 1 who it host by Pepe with Diana Munteanu and Alina Pușcaș. Now the judges are Ozana Barabancea, Cosmin Seleşi and Cătălin Preda.

Format
The show is broadcast live on Antena 1 on Sunday evenings, and is presented by Pepe with Roxana Ionescu and Roxana Vancea. The celebrities perform seven weeks in front of a panel of judges and a live audience in an Olympic-size diving pool with the result each week partly determined by public vote.

Production history
The series was first mentioned in May 2013, when it was announced that Antena 1 ordered what was called Celebrity Splash straight to series. Based on the Dutch series of the same name, it has celebrities perform dives from extreme heights and each week the challenges increase in difficulty.

Judges
On 14 June 2013, Daniel Buzdugan, Anda Adam and Cătălin Preda were confirmed as the three judges of the series.
Cosmin Selesi – courage 
Ozana Barabancea –  artistic impression
Cătălin Preda – technique

Main series results

Season summary

Season 1 (2013)
The debut season started airing on 7 July 2013 on Antena 1. The first season began with thirty-two Romanian celebrities. Vica Blochina withdrew before the series began, and was replaced by Jean de la Craiova. The first season ended on 18 August 2013. Piticu`, a dancer was declared the first winner of the series. The runner-up was gymnast Marian Drăgulescu, followed by stripper Cornel Păsat in third place, singer and violinist Silvia de la Vegas in fourth place and rapper CRBL was in the last place.

Season 2 (2014)
On 17 August 2013 was announced the second season of series. In this season in the judges Daniel Buzdugan and Anda Adam are replaced by Cosmin Selesi and Ozana Barabancea with Cătălin Preda. In this season Roxana Vancea, co host of the first season was replaced by the new host, Bianca Draguseanu. The season started on 11 July 2014 and ended on 5 September 2014. Cosmin Soare, a dancer was declared the second winner of the series. The runner-up was boxer Ionut Atodireserei, followed by actor Vladimir Draghia in third place, model Daniela Crudu in fourth place and singer Ruby was in the last place. This season involved Maria Casian, a 9-year-old girl who is ill but plays this sport.

Season 3 (2015)
On 1 June 2015 was announced the third season of series without a promo. The judges are the same of the past season, the Co host Roxana Ionescu and Bianca Draguseanu are replaced by Diana Munteanu and Alina Pușcaș with Pepe for this season. In this season, there are 40 Romanian Celebrities, they pass 3 on semifinal not 4 on the past 2 seasons. There are a new case, Marina and Andreea Sandu two children without 9 and 12 years, who are small champions of Romania. The season started airing on 23 and 24 July 2015 in two evening. In this season there disqualified 2 celebrities, first time in the history of series.

Overall ratings summary

References

Romanian television series
2013 Romanian television series debuts
Antena 1 (Romania) original programming
2010s Romanian television series